A beer fault or defect is flavor deterioration caused by the chemical change of organic matter in beer due either to improper production processes or storage. Some chemicals can cause flavor defects in beer: aldehydes such as dactyl organic acids, lipids, and sulfur compounds can influence beer taste. Fermentation byproducts, with minor fluctuations of just over 1% above the threshold, can also have an impact on the flavor of the beer. When the concentration of one or more of these chemicals exceeds the standard threshold, the flavor characteristics will change, creating a flavor defect.

Brewers need to be familiar with the proper taste of their beers in order to judge the quality of their brew. Precision in controlling the brewing process and quality of materials determines whether beer defects are produced.

Beer faults and wine faults 

Improper production processes or storage also can create wine flavor defects. Wine defects are often due to the external environment which causes chemical changes in the composition of the wine. Poor sanitary conditions of the winery, dirty wine, excessive use of wine barrels, oak, cork, rot, and the influence of temperature fluctuations of the wine flavor can all create defects. Beer faults differ from wine faults due to different chemical processes in the creation of the product.  In the brewing process for beer, the concentration of inorganic chemical elements can be too high or too low due to improper production. The malting process of joining malt and hops in the brewing process may cause microbial deterioration, which leads to the loss of beer flavor.

Diacetyl 

Diacetyl is a chemical compound produced in yeast during fermentation and is reabsorbed in the process. This odor will persist over time. Since the decomposition of α-acetolactate produces a large amount of diacetyl, the method can avoid the beer flavor defects caused by diacetyl as follows: boil the container and clean it before the yeast fermentation. The wort should avoid contact with oxygen when the fermentation begins. The temperature is raised by 2°-3° within 2 minutes of the end of the fermentation process, which allows the yeast to reabsorb faster so that the diacetyl content reaches 0.04 mg/L in the beer and does not cross the threshold.

Risotto taste 
Beer can have the taste of glutinous rice if the content of diacetyl in the beer exceeds its low taste threshold. For light-colored lagers, the diacetyl content preferably controls below 0.1 mg/L; for high-grade beer, it preferably controls below 0.05 mg/L. The solution is to increase the a-amino nitrogen content of the wort appropriately. Generally, the content of the 12P wort is controlled to be 180 ± 20 mg / L. Too low will lead to the synthesis and accumulation of a-acetic acid, lactic acid; too high will lead to excess nutrients in the yeast and excessive high alcohol content. Reduce the proliferation multiplication of yeast, generally the multiplication factor ≤ 3. Because the precursors of diacetyl and other yeast metabolic by-products are mostly producing during yeast breeding, we can reduce the yeast proliferation rate by adopting a series of measures such as low-temperature inoculation, inoculum, and low-temperature fermentation. Properly increase the fermentation temperature in the late stage of the main fermentation.

Acids that cause beer fault 
The acid produced during the fermentation of the raw materials of beer or the yeast produces natural acid when fermented, and is present in a large amount in beer. When it exceeds 170 mg/litre, it will create a strong sour taste of yogurt or pepper. Acids above the threshold are significant flavor defects in beer. A hygienic production environment, mashing the yeast strain for less than two hours, and keeping the fermentation temperature lower than  all help to reduce the amount of acid in beer. Brewing supplies and equipment should use non-marking equipment, because of the scratched fermentation device, bacteria will remain inside the scratches. These bacteria can cause yeast to be contaminated during fermentation.

Octanoic 

Octanoic acid (caprylic acid) is a fatty acid produced by the metabolism of yeast during fermentation. When the content of octanoic acid in the beer exceeds 4-6 mg/L, the beer will have a highly concentrated spicy taste. Storage of beer in an environment below  will reduce this spicy taste. The use of fresh yeast and removal of the beer from the yeast cake immediately after the fermentation is completed will also keep the octanoic acid content within the threshold.

Butyric 
Butyric acid is an acid produced by bacteria that produce syrup for a beer or that are mixed with oxygen during the production of wort to cause a decrease in Ph value. When the content of butyric acid in beer exceeds 2-3 mg/litre, the taste of beer tastes like metamorphic milk or rotten butter. Acidic sputum should be kept above 90 °F and avoid contact with oxygen. This method can avoid excessive butyric acid content. Beer production environment must be clean. External factors such as pollution can not monitor the syrup can also control the content of butyric acid.

Isovaleric 
Isovaleric acid is an acid produced by mixing with octanoic acid in the oxidation of alpha acids in beer, which causes the beer to smell the odor. The acid is present in the beer at a level of from 0.7 to 1 mg per litre. A clean and hygienic production environment avoids the mixing of caprylic acid with isovaleric acid. Hops should be stored in an oxygen-free vacuum tight container to prevent bacterial infection.

Alcohols that cause beer fault

Thiol 
Beers with thiols can produce flavors similar to rotten vegetables or smelly gullies. The threshold for mercaptans in beer is 1 microgram per liter. Mercaptan is caused by autolysis in the fermentation process of yeast strains, and may also be caused by anaerobic bacterial infection. The solution to the thiol is to remove the beer from the yeast four weeks after the start of the fermentation, thus avoiding the beer absorbing the mercaptan present from the dead yeast.

Lightstruck 
Lightstruck tastes like a sulphur in beer. The desire to cause this taste is produced by the chemical reaction between riboflavin and hop alpha acid in beer by natural light or artificial light. This is also the reason why most beer bottles use green packaging. If the beer bottles are not green or not placed in the dark, the rate of aging will increase. In addition to being packaged in green bottles, storing beer in the dark is also a way to avoid lightstruck.

Aldehyde

Acetaldehyde 
Acetaldehyde causes the beer to taste like a green apple when the presence of acetaldehyde exceeds the threshold (5-15 mg/L). During the fermentation of beer, the ethanol present in the yeast can make contact with air if stored improperly, producing an oxidation reaction that turns some of the ethanol into acetaldehyde. To prevent formation of acetaldehyde during the production process, fresh yeast should be fermented at a suitable ambient temperature, and the production environment should be hygienic. After the start of the fermentation, the fermentation is sealed with a material having a high sealing property. Prior to bottling, highly airtight materials transport beer to reduce oxygen entering the bottle.

Phenolic 
The presence threshold of phenolic in beer is 0.05-0.55 mg/L, and the beer with phenolic content exceeding the threshold has bitterness and smoky flavor. The washing water of the yeast is derived from tap water, and the chlorophenol in the tap water and the disinfectant containing the chlorine water are brewed to make the beer contain phenolic. Therefore, an effective way to reduce phenolic is that tap water can be filtered prior to use. Non-chlorine disinfectants can also be selected for the type of disinfectant. The extraction of wort is at least 1.008 SG.

Hydrogen sulfide 
Hydrogen sulfide produces a rotten egg flavor in beer. All yeast strains produce a certain amount of hydrogen sulfide during the fermentation process. The threshold of hydrogen sulfide in beer is 4 μg/L, and most of the hydrogen sulfide is doped in the released nitrogen dioxide, so when carrying out a large amount of fermentation, it takes a lot of time before bottling. Fermentation. Healthy yeast is used and fully oxidized wort, which increases the zinc content of the wort and reduces the hydrogen sulfide content.

Ferrous sulfate 

Ferrous sulfate is caused by the contact of beer with metal materials during the brewing process, resulting in metal ion leaching. Excessive levels of ferrous sulfate can make beer taste like rusty iron and copper. If the content of ferrous sulfate in beer exceeds 1-1.5 mg/litre, drinkers will develop symptoms of dizziness. Drinkers may have symptoms of poisoning if the beer contains a lot of ferrous sulfates. To prevent the formation of ferrous sulfate in the process of producing beer, the water used for brewing is subjected to a metal ion reaction. Containers for fermented and finished beer should also be used in food grade plastics. Beer should not contact with any corrodible container to reduce the number of metal ions in the beer.

Oxygen 

Oxygen can cause oxidation, which causes some aging reactions due to carbonyl compounds. The original auxiliary material is protected by CO2 or N2 when pulverized, and it is not easy to take too long before smashing. CO2 or N2 protect the equipment during the mashing process, and the bottom feed is used when smashing. The mixing frequency of sputum reduces, and as the stirring speed is reduced, pumps, seals, valves, etc. can not leak. The maintenance can strengthen; when the wort boils, the pot door should close, and the boiling time should finish after the main leaven, and the product should be served as soon as possible. The post-fermenter tank uses CO2 to prepare the pressure, and the speed of the fermentation tank is controlled to be less than 1m/s.

Dimethyl Sulfide 
Dimethyl sulfide exhibits a sour-sweet cream flavor when it exceeds 0.025 mg/L in beer. Dimethyl sulfide is derived from sulfur-based organic compounds produced during malt development. Bacterial contamination occurs during the fermentation of yeast, and bacterial contamination can also cause sulphur to produce dimethyl sulfide. If the beer uses a particular variety of malts, such as pulses malt, barley malt and other sulfur-based organic compounds, the content of dimethyl sulfide is higher than ordinary ale, so the beer in the production process should reduce the use of such products. Too much water in the wort can also produce large amounts of sulfur-based organic compounds, so the malt should be stored in a dry place. Based on the volatility of dimethyl sulfide, the wort can be volatilized by boiling at a high temperature for 60 minutes to 90 minutes to liberate 90% of dimethyl sulfide.

Oxidation 

Oxidised beer has the mouldy taste of old newspapers. Beer with 100% oxygen exposure has the fastest oxidation rate. Temperature is another cause of oxidation, as it produces a lot of oxygen in a high-temperature environment. This oxygen also accelerates the price of beer oxidation. To avoid excessive beer exposure to oxygen, the headspace reserved for the beer to be placed in the bottle is less than one inch. If the beer is to be stored, the temperature inside the bowl should be below 50 degrees Fahrenheit.

Detecting Beer Faults 
Historically, inspectors had their own methods of testing the quality of beer or checking for specific faults, such as the test that might have been done to check if there was too much sugar in it (that supposedly involved the inspector pouring a small amount onto his chair and sitting down to see if his clothing stuck to the seat.) Now, there are guides such as the Complete Beer Fault Guide which explain what to look for and how to detect specific faults by taste, smell, and texture/mouth feel.

See also

Beer chemistry

References

External links
 "A few beer faults and their origin – in a nutshell"

Brewing
Beer
Fermented drinks
Alcoholic drinks